Dechapol Puavaranukroh (born 20 May 1997) is a Thai badminton player. He was a gold medalist at the 2014 BWF World Junior Championships in the boys' doubles event with his partner Kittinupong Kedren. Puavaranukroh claimed doubles titles at the 2017 Southeast Asian Games by winning the gold medal in the men's doubles with Kedren and in the mixed doubles with Sapsiree Taerattanachai. Together with Taerattanachai, he won the silver and gold medals at the BWF World Championships in 2019 and 2021 respectively, became the first Thai pair who won the world title. The duo made a clean sweep of all three 2020 Asian leg titles in Thailand and all 2021 Bali leg titles, thus climbing to world number 1 in the BWF ranking. Puavaranukroh and Taerattanachai made history as the first ever Thai players to win a title in the year-end Finals tournaments and rank first in the world ranking.

Career 

Puavaranukroh and his partner, Taerattanachai, reached their first ever final at a Superseries event in 2017 Singapore Open.

Puavaranukroh and his partner, Taerattanachai, competed at the 2020 Summer Olympics, but they were eliminated in the quarter-finals.

Achievements

BWF World Championships 
Mixed doubles

Asian Championships 
Mixed doubles

Southeast Asian Games 
Men's doubles

Mixed doubles

BWF World Junior Championships 
Boys' doubles

Asian Youth Games 
Mixed doubles

BWF World Tour (13 titles, 9 runners-up) 
The BWF World Tour, which was announced on 19 March 2017 and implemented in 2018, is a series of elite badminton tournaments sanctioned by the Badminton World Federation (BWF). The BWF World Tour is divided into levels of World Tour Finals, Super 1000, Super 750, Super 500, Super 300, and the BWF Tour Super 100.

 Mixed doubles

BWF Superseries (1 runner-up) 
The BWF Superseries, which was launched on 14 December 2006 and implemented in 2007, was a series of elite badminton tournaments, sanctioned by the Badminton World Federation (BWF). BWF Superseries levels were Superseries and Superseries Premier. A season of Superseries consisted of twelve tournaments around the world that had been introduced since 2011. Successful players were invited to the Superseries Finals, which were held at the end of each year.

Mixed doubles

  BWF Superseries Finals tournament
  BWF Superseries Premier tournament
  BWF Superseries tournament

BWF Grand Prix (1 title, 3 runners-up) 
The BWF Grand Prix had two levels, the Grand Prix and Grand Prix Gold. It was a series of badminton tournaments sanctioned by the Badminton World Federation (BWF) and played between 2007 and 2017.

Mixed doubles

  BWF Grand Prix Gold tournament
  BWF Grand Prix tournament

BWF International Challenge/Series (2 runners-up) 
Men's doubles

  BWF International Challenge tournament
  BWF International Series tournament

Performance timeline

National team 
 Junior level

 Senior level

Individual competitions

Junior level
 Boys' singles

 Boys' doubles

 Mixed doubles

Senior level

Men's doubles

Mixed doubles

References

External links 

 

1997 births
Living people
Dechapol Puavaranukroh
Dechapol Puavaranukroh
Badminton players at the 2020 Summer Olympics
Dechapol Puavaranukroh
Badminton players at the 2018 Asian Games
Dechapol Puavaranukroh
Dechapol Puavaranukroh
Dechapol Puavaranukroh
Southeast Asian Games medalists in badminton
Competitors at the 2017 Southeast Asian Games
World No. 1 badminton players
Dechapol Puavaranukroh